is a mountain pass in the north-end of the Hidaka Mountains of Hokkaidō, Japan. Snow is possible on the pass from October to April. Japan National Route 237 crosses the pass between Hidaka and Shimukappu.

References

 Geographical Survey Institute
 Northern Road Navi

Mountain passes of Japan